The Blue Knight(s) may refer to:

 The Blue Knight (novel), a novel by Joseph Wambaugh
 The Blue Knight (film), a 1973 TV film based on Wambaugh's novel, starring William Holden
 The Blue Knight (TV series), a 1975 series based on Wambaugh's novel, starring George Kennedy
 The Blue Knight (Tokyo Mew Mew), a fictional character in the manga and anime series Tokyo Mew Mew
 Blue Knights Drum and Bugle Corps, from Colorado, U.S.
 Greg Valentine or "The Blue Knight", American professional wrestler
 Der Blaue Reiter, an art movement known also as The Blue Rider
 VMM-365 or the "Blue Knights", a United States Marine Corps tiltrotor squadron
 Blue Knights, a smooth jazz band